Jarkko Niemi (born 3 November 1982) is a Finnish racing cyclist. He won the Finnish national road race title in 2012.

References

External links

1982 births
Living people
Finnish male cyclists
Sportspeople from Tampere